Alyaksandr Matsyukhevich (born 2 April 1990) is a former Belarusian footballer.

External links
 
 
 Profile at FC Brest website

1990 births
Living people
Belarusian footballers
Association football midfielders
Belarusian expatriate footballers
Expatriate footballers in Poland
FC Dynamo Brest players
FC Volna Pinsk players
FC Baranovichi players
FC Slonim-2017 players
Sportspeople from Brest, Belarus